Aruna Stambha (Sun Pillar) is a sixteen-sided  tall monolithic chlorite stone Pillar having the idol of Aruna (Charioteer of Sun) on the top.

It is an important Landmark of Puri and the pilgrims and devotees worship it with great reverence. The Stambha has a magnificent base carved with military scenes and other figures. Its Capitol is ornamented by a series of lotus petals. The monolithic shafts nearly in circumference is sixteen sided. Above this are two gradually diminishing square slabs surmounted by the idol of Aruna in the act of praying to the god Sun. The whole Stambha is a monument of great beauty.

History 
According to Madala Panji, Chronicle of Jagannath Temple, mentioned that the Aruna Stambha was brought from the Konark (Sun temple) during the reign of Bhoi king Dibyasingha Deva II by the Maratha guru 'Brahmachari Gosain' and erected here in front of Singhadwara. In 1815 the artists of Colin Mackenzie preparing a sketch of the Pillar at Puri on 26 April. The Pillar seems to have been removed to Puri in the last quarter of the 18th century. From the Vedic times, Surya is taken to be identical with Vishnu. Hence it was quite appropriate to place in front of the temple of Vishnu-Jagannath at Puri.

References 
 

Jagannath Temple Complex
Archaeological monuments in Odisha
History of Odisha
Puri
Surya temples